Gerald Barry (born 28 April 1952) is an Irish composer.

Life and works
Gerald Barry was born in Clarehill, Clarecastle, County Clare, in the Republic of Ireland. He was educated at St. Flannan's College, Ennis, County Clare. He went on to studied music at University College Dublin, in Amsterdam with Peter Schat, in Cologne with Karlheinz Stockhausen and Mauricio Kagel, and in Vienna with Friedrich Cerha. Barry taught at University College Cork from 1982 to 1986. Growing up in rural Clare, he had little exposure to music except through the radio: "The thing that was the lightning flash for me, in terms of Saint Paul on the road to Damascus, would have been an aria from a Handel opera, from Xerxes maybe, that I heard on the radio. I heard this woman singing this, and bang – my head went. And that was how I discovered music."

"Barry's is a world of sharp edges, of precisely defined yet utterly unpredictable musical objects. His music sounds like no one else's in its diamond-like hardness, its humour, and sometimes, its violence." He often conceives of material independently of its instrumental medium, recycling ideas from piece to piece, as in the reworking of Triorchic Blues from a violin to a piano piece to an aria for countertenor in his television opera The Triumph of Beauty and Deceit:It seemed to me unprecedented: the combination of the ferociously objective treatment of the material and the intense passion of the working-out, and both at an extreme of brilliance. And the harmony – that there was harmony at all, and that it was so beautiful and lapidary. It functions, again, irrationally, but powerfully, to build tension and to create structure. It wasn't just repetitive. It builds. And the virtuosity, the display of it, that combination of things seemed, to me, to be new, and a major way forward.

His most recent opera, The Importance of Being Earnest, has become a huge success after its world premiere at Los Angeles and European premiere at the Barbican, London. A critic comments:He writes "what he likes" in the way Strindberg does, not trying to characterise his characters, but letting them perform his own specialities, a kind of platform for his own musical specialities. As in Strindberg where you feel every sentence stands for itself and the characters are sort of borrowed for the use of saying them (borrowed to flesh out the text, rather than the other way round), that they've been out for the day. In Gerald's opera the whole apparatus – for that's what it is – takes on a kind of surrealistic shape, like one person's torso on someone else's legs being forced to walk, half the characters in the opera and half the composer.

Operas
The Intelligence Park, libretto by Vincent Deane (1981-8)
The Triumph of Beauty and Deceit, libretto by Meredith Oakes (1991–92)
The Bitter Tears of Petra von Kant, based on the play (later a film) by Rainer Werner Fassbinder (2005)
La Plus Forte, a one-act opera for soprano and orchestra based on Strindberg's play (2007)
The Importance of Being Earnest, libretto by Gerald Barry after Oscar Wilde (2010)
 Alice's Adventures Under Ground, libretto by Gerald Barry after Lewis Carroll (2014/15)

Selected other works
Things that Gain by Being Painted for soprano, speaker, cello and piano (1977)
Things That Gain for piano (1977)
'_'  for ensemble (1979)
ø for 2 pianos (1979)
Kitty Lie Over Across From The Wall for piano and orchestra (1979)
Sur les Pointes for piano (1981)
Au Milieu for piano (1981)
O Lord How Vain for choir (1984)
Five Chorales from The Intelligence Park for two pianos (1985)
From The Intelligence Park for orchestra (1986)
Swinging Tripes and Trillibubkins for piano (1986)
Water Parted from The Intelligence Park for soprano or countertenor and piano (1986)
String Quartet No. 1 (1985)
Chevaux-de-frise for orchestra (1988)
Bob for ensemble (1989)
Triorchic Blues for piano (1991)
Sextet for ensemble (1993)
From The Triumph of Beauty and Deceit for orchestra (1994)
Triorchic Blues for solo trumpet (1994)
The Chair for organ (1994)
Piano Quartet No. 1 (1994)
The Conquest of Ireland for solo bass voice and orchestra (1995)
Quintet for cor anglais, clarinet, cello, double bass and piano (1994)
Low for clarinet and piano (1995)
Piano Quartet No. 2 (1996)
Before The Road for four clarinets (1997)
String Quartet No. 2 (1998)
1998 for violin and piano (1998)
The Eternal Recurrence, a setting of Nietzsche for soprano and orchestra (1999)
The Coming of Winter for choir (2000)
Wiener Blut for large ensemble (2000)
Wiener Blut for orchestra (2000)
String Quartet No. 3 (Six Marches) (2001)
Snow is White for piano quartet (2001)
God Save the Queen for solo boy's voice, choir and large ensemble (2001)
Dead March for large ensemble (2001)
In the Asylum for piano trio (2003)
Trumpeter for solo trumpet (2003)
Day for orchestra (versions for strings and full orchestra (2005)
Lisbon for piano and ensemble (2006)
First Sorrow (String Quartet No. 4) (2006
Karl Heinz Stockhausen (1928–2007) for voice and piano (2008)
Feldman's Sixpenny Editions for large ensemble (2008)
Le Vieux Sourd for piano (2008)
Beethoven for bass voice and large ensemble (2008)
No other people for orchestra (2009)
Schott and Sons, Mainz for solo bass voice and choir (2009)
Piano Concerto (2012)
O Tannenbaum for choir or voice and piano (2012)
No People for ensemble (nonet) (2013)
Humiliated and Insulted for piano (2013)
Baroness von Ritkart for orchestra or any number of instruments: 1 – Clever, noble, but not talented. 2 – Talented, noble, but not clever. 3 – Talented, clever, but not noble. (2014)
 Crossing the Bar for voice and any instruments or orchestra (2014)
 The Destruction of Sodom for 8 horns and 2 wind machines (2015)
 Canada for voice and orchestra (2017)
 Organ Concerto for organ and orchestra (2018)
 Viola Concerto (2019)

Reception
It was written in The Irish Times that "no other Irish composer springs to mind who carries the same aura of excitement and originality or whose music means so much to such a wide range of listeners. Certainly, there has been no Irish premiere that has made the impression of The Conquest of Ireland (heard in the festival's opening concert las Wednesday) since Barry's opera The Intelligence Park was seen at the Gate Theatre in 1990". In a 2013 guide to Barry's musical output, Tom Service of The Guardian praised Chevaux-de-frise (1988), The Bitter Tears of Petra von Kant (2005), Lisbon (2006), Beethoven (2008), and The Importance of Being Earnest (2012).

Recordings

Gerald Barry: Chamber and Solo Piano Works. Nua Nós, Noriko Kawai (piano), Dáirine Ní Mheadhra (conductor): NMC DO22 (1994).
Barry. Orchestral Works. National Symphony Orchestra of Ireland, Robert Houlohan (conductor): Marco Polo 8.225006 (1997).
The Triumph of Beauty and Deceit. Soloists, Composers Ensemble, Diego Masson: Largo 5135 (1998).
Things That Gain. Music for piano, 2 pianos, chamber and vocal music. Gerald Barry and Kevin Volans (pianos), Xenia Ensemble. Nicholas Clapton (countertenor): Black Box Music BBM 1011 (1998).
La Jalousie Taciturne. Irish Chamber Orchestra, Fionnuala Hunt (conductor): Black Box Music BBM 1013 (1998).
Snow is White. The Schubert Ensemble: NMC D075 (2001).
In the Asylum. Trio Fibonacci: NMC D107 (2005).
The Intelligence Park. Almeida Ensemble, Robert Houlihan (conductor): NMC D122 (2005).
The Bitter Tears of Petra von Kant. Soloists, RTÉ National Symphony Orchestra, Gerhard Markson (conductor): RTÉ 261 (2005).
Triorchic Blues for trumpet. Marco Blaauw (trumpet): BV Haast Records CD 0406 (2006).
Lisbon. Thomas Adès (piano), Birmingham Contemporary Music Group: Contemporary Music Centre CMC CD08 (2009).
Lady Bracknell's Song, from The Importance of Being Earnest. Gerald Barry (voice & piano): NMC D150 (2009).
The Chair for organ. David Adams (self-produced, 2008).
The Importance of Being Earnest. Soloists, Birmingham Contemporary Music Group, Thomas Adès (conductor): NMC D197 (2014).
Barry meets Beethoven. Soloists, Chamber Choir Ireland, Crash Ensemble, Paul Hillier (conductor): Orchid Classics ORC 100055 (2016).

References

External links
Barry about his organ concerto
Review of the premiere of Barry's opera Alice's Adventures
Composer's page at Schott Music
Barry answers six questions put to composers of contemporary music
Gerald Barry on beauty and related issues
 
Triorchic Blues for violin played by Daniel Pioro
Recording of First Sorrow (2007)

1952 births
20th-century classical composers
20th-century male musicians
21st-century classical composers
21st-century male musicians
Alumni of University College Dublin
Aosdána members
Irish classical composers
Irish male classical composers
Irish opera composers
Living people
Male opera composers
Musicians from County Clare
Pupils of Karlheinz Stockhausen